The 1991–92 season was the 106th season in the history of Luton Town Football Club. It was Luton Town's 71st consecutive season in the Football League, and their 74th overall. It was also their tenth successive season in the First Division, and their 16th overall. Luton Town were relegated on the season's final day, and thus condemned to second-tier football for the following season. This deprived them of a place in the new FA Premier League.

It was the first season of David Pleat's second spell as Luton Town manager; he had returned in the 1991 close season as successor to Jimmy Ryan, having previously been the club's manager from 1978 to 1986.

This article covers the period from 1 July 1991 to 30 June 1992.

Background

The 1985–86 season was David Pleat's final year with Luton, and it was a success as Luton finished ninth. Even following his departure, the team continued to play well – 1986–87 saw a best-ever finish of seventh under John Moore. The following year Ray Harford's team won the League Cup with a 3–2 victory over Arsenal, and finished ninth in the league to boot. However, 1988–89 saw Luton drop to 16th, and in 1989–90 the team were battling relegation by December. The replacement of Harford with Jimmy Ryan in January saw Luton improve enough to escape demotion on the final day of the season, a feat that Ryan's team repeated a year later. Despite keeping Luton in Division One for a ninth successive season, Ryan was fired by chairman Peter Nelkin two days later due a "personality clash". David Pleat was promptly re-appointed in his stead.

Review

July–September
Right away, Pleat was forced to sell, as homesick star forward Lars Elstrup was sold back to Odense for £200,000. Brian Stein was brought back as his replacement, while another striker, Phil Gray, was signed from Tottenham Hotspur. On the pitch, the season started badly – Luton did not score a goal for four matches, and failed to win in five. Trevor Peake arrived on 27 August, while Kingsley Black, the Northern Ireland international, was sold to Nottingham Forest for £1.5 million on 2 September.

The first victory of the season came two days after the sale of Black, as Luton defeated Southampton 2–1 at Kenilworth Road. Wimbledon then inflicted a 3–0 reverse at Selhurst Park, before the news came that former player Mick Harford had returned from Derby County to lead the forward line. Harford scored two in his first match, to secure a 2–1 win over Oldham Athletic. However, Luton then lost 1–0 at home to Queens Park Rangers before Manchester United piled on the misery with a 5–0 demolition at Old Trafford. A 1–1 draw with Notts County rounded up the month.

October–December
Two months then followed without a win, as Dave Beaumont left for Hibernian and new signing Steve Thompson left after only seven matches in a swap deal with Leicester City for Des Linton and Scott Oakes. Talented full back Matt Jackson also moved on, to sign for Everton. Form was no better in the cups, as Luton were knocked out of both the League Cup and the Full Members' Cup in October. The acquisition of goalkeeper Steve Sutton in November raised spirits, though Luton's next victory did not come until 20 December, when a Harford goal sealed a 1–0 win over Coventry. The next two matches were at home, and Luton won them both – another goal from Harford secured a defeat of Arsenal on Boxing Day, and Chelsea were beaten 2–0 two days later. Despite three successive wins, Luton still remained in the relegation zone on New Year's Day.

January–March
January was a fruitless month – Nottingham Forest's Des Walker scored an injury-time equaliser to deny Luton their first away win, and the team crashed out of the FA Cup at Sheffield United three days later. Graham Rodger was sold to Hibernian on 8 January, and Chris Kamara was acquired as a replacement. Three consecutive defeats preceded a win against Norwich City on 8 February. Manchester City then beat Luton 4–0 at Maine Road, before Sheffield United visited Kenilworth Road in the League – this time around, Luton won 2–1. The next six matches saw four draws and two losses – tellingly, Luton had not won on the road all season. The board refused to pay the fee to keep Sutton, and so he signed for Derby County instead. Mervyn Day was brought in as a short-term replacement, while midfielder Darron McDonough moved to Newcastle United.

April–June
Imre Varadi arrived on loan, and scored on his debut as Luton beat Wimbledon. A week later, Luton lost 5–1 at Oldham. Victory over Nottingham Forest at Kenilworth Road gave Luton hope – they were now only three points behind Coventry City with four matches left. Luton drew at home to Manchester United on the 18th, and as Coventry lost to Everton, reduced the gap to two points. Coventry lost again two days later, but as Luton slumped to defeat at Queens Park Rangers no ground was made up. The task was made even more difficult as Luton's terrible goal difference meant that they would have to finish a point ahead of Coventry to stay up – to equal them would not be enough. Luton beat Aston Villa on 25 April, but the news came that Luton fans were dreading – Coventry had beaten West Ham United, and the gap was still two points.

In order for Luton to stay up, they would have to travel to already-relegated Notts County, win their first away match of the campaign, and hope for an Aston Villa victory over Coventry. Julian James gave Luton the lead required, but two goals from County's Rob Matthews put the seal on a dismal season that had gone by without a single away win. Despite losing 2–0 at Villa Park, Coventry stayed up – Luton were relegated after ten years of Division One football.

Ever-present midfielder Mark Pembridge left for Derby County for a £1.25 million fee in June.

Match results 

Luton Town results given first.

Legend

Football League First Division

FA Cup

Football League Cup

Full Members Cup

League table

Player details 
Last match played on 2 May 1992.
Players arranged in order of starts (in all competitions), with the greater number of substitute appearances taking precedence in case of an equal number of started matches.

Transfers

In

Out

Loans in

Loans out

See also
1991–92 in English football

Footnotes

A.  Lost 2–1 on penalties
B.  Upon its formation for the 1992–93 season, the FA Premier League became the top tier of English football; the First, Second and Third Divisions then became the second, third and fourth tiers, respectively.
C.  Steve Thompson moved to Leicester City in exchange for Des Linton and Scott Oakes.

References
General
Player and match statistics sourced from: 
Match statistics sourced from: 
Specific

Luton Town F.C. seasons
Luton Town